Ludvig Gade born in (16 April 1823 in Copenhagen–7 April 1897 in Copenhagen) was a Danish dancer and mime. Ludvig Gade was Director of Royal Danish Ballet 1877–1890 .

Gade came early into the Royal Danish Theater school . He stood as a ballet child on stage for the first time in 1836 in " Hermann von Unna, "but first had its debut 8 January 1844 in the " Festival in Albano ". His tall and powerful figure meant, howeverthat it was not as a dancer he should be known but as a mime . It was the character roles, ranging from the deepest tragic to the comic boldly, that was his strength. His roles include corporal Nouveau " Bellman ", King Svend in" Valdemar , "Knight Mogens in" A Folk Tale "servant of" Mountain Ground ", and perhaps the greatest of them all as Bear in" Valkyrie ". 

In addition to his position as a dancer in ballet staff, he also had other tasks at the theater. In the 1857–1858 season, he was appointed as a stage director for the opera, during August Bournonville's leaves he served several times as a ballet conductor. After Bournonville's death in 1879, he took over the leadership of the Danish ballet. He retired from the Royal Danish Theatre at the end of the in 1889–1890 season, but later performed a few times as a guest of Harald Wartooth's role in 'Valkyrie'.

Gade became Knight of Dannebrog in 1886 and is buried in Assistants Cemetery . There is a painting of him by COJ Lund at the Royal Theatre as well as a woodcut of O. Andersen modelled after Lund's photograph.

References 

Danish male dancers
1823 births
1897 deaths
Danish mimes